WWE Evolution was a women's professional wrestling pay-per-view (PPV) and livestreaming event produced by WWE. It was held for wrestlers from the promotion's Raw, SmackDown, NXT, and NXT UK brand divisions. The event took place on October 28, 2018, at the Nassau Veterans Memorial Coliseum in Uniondale, New York. It was the first and currently only WWE PPV to consist solely of women's matches.

The main card consisted of seven matches. Three of WWE's then-four women's championships were defended on the main card; the fourth was defended in a dark match before the show. It also featured the final of the 2018 Mae Young Classic tournament. In the main event, Ronda Rousey defeated Nikki Bella by submission to retain the Raw Women's Championship. In the penultimate match, Becky Lynch defeated Charlotte Flair in a Last Woman Standing match to retain the SmackDown Women's Championship. In other prominent matches, Toni Storm defeated Io Shirai to win the 2018 Mae Young Classic, and Shayna Baszler defeated Kairi Sane to become the first two-time NXT Women's Champion.

Production

Background 
On the July 23, 2018, episode of Monday Night Raw, WWE executive Stephanie McMahon announced that for the first time, WWE would hold an all-women's pay-per-view (PPV) and WWE Network event, which was titled Evolution. It was scheduled to take place on October 28, 2018, at the Nassau Veterans Memorial Coliseum in Uniondale, New York, replacing the previously planned Clash of Champions. WWE Hall of Famers Lita, Trish Stratus, and Beth Phoenix were advertised as taking part in the event. It was also announced that the event would host the final of the 2018 Mae Young Classic and that all four of WWE's women's championships at the time would be defended; however, the NXT UK Women's Championship match was later removed from the main card and occurred as a dark match before the show.

WWE's executive vice president of talent, live events and creative Triple H explained that WWE's female performers "deserve[d] the opportunity" for a prominent showcase, and that it "was simply the right time for this to happen." He denied that the event was intended to be as a counterpoint for Crown Jewel—a subsequent pay-per-view days later in Saudi Arabia that, per the country's women's rights policies, would not include WWE's female performers at the time.

Storylines 
The card consisted of seven matches that resulted from scripted storylines, where wrestlers portrayed villains, heroes, or less distinguishable characters in scripted events that built tension and culminated in a wrestling match or series of matches, with results predetermined by WWE's writers on the Raw, SmackDown, NXT, and NXT UK brands. Storylines were produced on WWE's weekly television shows, Monday Night Raw, SmackDown Live, and NXT.

On August 18, a match between Alexa Bliss and Trish Stratus was scheduled for Evolution. Then, on September 3, a match between Lita and Mickie James was scheduled for the event; the two last faced each other back in 2006 at Survivor Series where James won the original WWE Women's Championship from Lita in the latter's retirement match. On the October 8 episode of Raw, a confrontation between the four women occurred. It was then revealed that instead of the two singles matches, Bliss and James would face Stratus and Lita in a tag team match at Evolution. On October 26, however, Alicia Fox replaced Bliss due to injury, but it was revealed that she would be in James and Fox's corner for the match.

At NXT TakeOver: Brooklyn 4, Kairi Sane defeated Shayna Baszler to win the NXT Women's Championship. On the September 26 episode of NXT, a rematch between the two for the title was scheduled for Evolution.

At SummerSlam, Ronda Rousey won the Raw Women's Championship. Following her win, The Bella Twins (Nikki and Brie Bella) celebrated with the new champion. At Super Show-Down, it was announced that a title defense for Rousey was scheduled for Evolution. At that same event, Rousey and The Bella Twins teamed up to defeat The Riott Squad (Ruby Riott, Liv Morgan, and Sarah Logan). On the following episode of Raw, Rousey and The Bella Twins defeated The Riott Squad in a rematch. Following the match, however, The Bella Twins attacked Rousey, turning heel. Later that night, a title match between Rousey and Nikki was then scheduled for Evolution.

At SummerSlam, Charlotte Flair defeated Becky Lynch and defending champion Carmella in a triple threat match to become a two-time SmackDown Women's Champion by pinning Lynch. Following the match, Lynch attacked Flair, turning heel. Lynch then defeated Flair to win the championship at Hell in a Cell. A rematch occurred at Super Show-Down where Flair won by disqualification after Lynch attacked her with the title belt, thus Lynch retained. The two faced each other in a rematch on the following episode of SmackDown, however, it ended in a double countout, resulting in Lynch retaining again. SmackDown General Manager Paige then announced that the two would have another rematch for the SmackDown Women's Championship at Evolution in a last woman standing match, the first in WWE.

On the October 15 episode of Raw, it was announced that a battle royal for a women's championship match would also take place at Evolution with various competitors announced to take part, including WWE legends and Hall of Famers.

On the October 22 episode of Raw, it was announced that The Riott Squad would face off against the team of Sasha Banks, Bayley and Natalya.

Event 

Before the event aired live on pay-per-view, a dark match took place in which Rhea Ripley defeated Dakota Kai to retain the NXT UK Women's Championship.

Preliminary matches 
The actual pay-per-view opened with Alicia Fox and Mickie James (with Alexa Bliss) facing Lita and Trish Stratus. In the end, Lita performed a "Litasault" on both James and Fox, and Stratus performed a "Chick Kick" on James to win the match.

Next was the 20-woman Battle Royal which started with various WWE legends eliminating both of The IIconics (Peyton Royce and Billie Kay) and reuniting against current women. In the end, thinking that she won the match, Zelina Vega, who had not actually been eliminated, began celebrating, not realizing that neither Nia Jax or Ember Moon were eliminated. After Jax eliminated Vega by throwing her at Tamina, who was already eliminated and was standing at ringside, Jax eliminated Moon to earn a future opportunity at the Raw Women's Championship.

After that, Toni Storm fought Io Shirai in the tournament final of the 2018 Mae Young Classic. Shirai performed a dropkick on Storm from the top rope, followed by a moonsault at ringside. In the end, Storm countered a Moonsault by raising her knees and performed the "Storm Zero" on Shirai to win the match and the trophy. After the match, an elated Storm was congratulated by Triple H, Stephanie McMahon, and Sara Amato.

In the fourth match, Natalya teamed up with Bayley and Sasha Banks to face The Riott Squad (Liv Morgan, Ruby Riott, and Sarah Logan). In the climax, Natalya applied a double sharpshooter on Riott and Logan, only for Morgan to perform the "201 Facebreaker" on Natalya for a nearfall. Natalya then performed a powerbomb on Morgan, followed by a diving elbow drop from Bayley and a frog splash from Banks for the victory.

Next, Kairi Sane defended the NXT Women's Championship against Shayna Baszler. During the match, as Sane attempted to perform an "Insane Elbow", Baszler rolled out of the ring. Sane then performed a diving crossbody into Baszler and threw Baszler at her fellow and former MMA Four Horsewomen, Marina Shafir and Jessamyn Duke, who were at ringside. In the climax, Duke and Shafir distracted Sane which led to Baszler applying the "Kirifuda Clutch". However, Sane was able to counter into a roll-up for a nearfall. Sane managed another pinning combination, but Baszler kicked out and sent Sane into a kick from Duke. Baszler then applied the "Kirifuda Clutch" on Sane, who passed out, thus Baszler won by technical submission and became the first two-time NXT Women's Champion.

In the penultimate match, Becky Lynch defended the SmackDown Women's Championship against Charlotte Flair in a Last Woman Standing match. Lynch attacked Flair with a kendo stick and a chair. Lynch attempted a "Bexploder Suplex" on Flair, but Flair countered and delivered a Back Suplex to Lynch directly onto a pile of chairs. Flair performed a Senton following a Moonsault on Lynch through a table. Flair applied the "Figure-Eight Leglock" on Lynch, whose leg was wrapped around a ladder, but Lynch was able to escape by attacking Flair with a steel chair. After Lynch and Flair brawled in the crowd, Flair cleared off the German announce table, only for Lynch to hit her with the SmackDown Women's title belt. Lynch then performed a leg drop from a ladder on Flair through the announce table and buried her under the weapons, but Flair stood at a nine count. Flair then retrieved another kendo stick and repeatedly struck Lynch with it before performing a "spear" on Lynch. In the end, Flair attempted a top-rope Moonsault on Lynch, who was lying on another table, only for Lynch to intercept Flair with a Powerbomb through the table. Flair was unable to make it to her feet before the ten count, thus Lynch retained.

Main event 
In the main event, Ronda Rousey defended the Raw Women's Championship against Nikki Bella (accompanied by Brie Bella). During the match, Nikki dominated Rousey for a majority of the match. On the outside of the ring, Brie shoved Rousey into the ring post whilst the referee was distracted. Rousey attempted a "Piper's Pit" on Nikki, only for Brie to interfere. Rousey then performed the modified Samoan Drop on both Nikki and Brie for a near-fall. In the climax, Nikki performed the "Rack Attack 2.0" on Rousey for a nearfall. While Nikki was on the middle rope, Rousey performed a "Small Package driver" on Nikki and applied an armbar on Nikki, who submitted, to retain the title.

Aftermath 
On the October 29 episode of Raw, it was announced that Raw Women's Champion Ronda Rousey would face off against SmackDown Women's Champion Becky Lynch at Survivor Series as part of the annual interbrand competition. Later that same evening, Nia Jax defeated Ember Moon after a distraction by Tamina, leading to a staredown between Tamina and Jax. After defeating Moon in a rematch the following week, Jax joined Tamina in attacking Moon, turning Jax into a villainess and establishing an alliance with Tamina. At Survivor Series, Jax was victorious for Team Raw as the lone survivor in the women's elimination match after pushing her teammate, Sasha Banks, into Asuka. On the November 19 episode of Raw, Jax's Raw Women's Championship match was confirmed to happen at TLC: Tables, Ladders & Chairs.

After losing to Becky Lynch at Evolution, Charlotte Flair received an offer from SmackDown General Manager Paige on the October 30 episode of SmackDown, being asked to captain Team SmackDown in the women's elimination match, only for Charlotte to turn down the offer. Charlotte instead became Lynch's replacement in a match against Raw Women's Champion Ronda Rousey at the event, as Lynch suffered a legit injury just days prior to Survivor Series.

On the November 7 episode of NXT, it was announced that Kairi Sane would be invoking her rematch clause and would face NXT Women's Champion Shayna Baszler in a two-out-of-three-falls match at NXT TakeOver: WarGames.

Future all-female events
In a conference call for June 2021's NXT TakeOver: In Your House event, Triple H was questioned on if WWE would ever hold another all-female event. He said it was possible, "but it's not a must-have at the moment." He also found it odd that people thought that doing more all-female events would mean equality for the women's division, but cited the contradiction in that WWE would be criticized if they would run an all-male event; essentially, separate does not mean equal. He also responded to something that former WWE wrestler Mickie James had said in regards to the National Wrestling Alliance's August 2021 all-female event, EmPowerrr, in which James served as an executive producer. James had said that she wanted the best female wrestlers in the world on the event regardless of contractual issues. Triple H said that from a business standpoint, that did not make sense and also gave his own opinion, stating that if female wrestlers wanted to face the best in the world, they should come to WWE. Before James' release from WWE in April 2021, she had pushed for the company to produce another all-female event as well as an all-female brand, but said she was "cut off at every opportunity." A WWE official told her that "women's wrestling doesn't make money" and that Evolution was the company's "lowest-rated pay-per-view ever in the history of WWE pay-per-views." Former WWE wrestler Maria Kanellis also stated that former Head of WWE Talent Relations, Mark Carano, informed her that there would not be another all-female event. Other WWE female performers, notably Sasha Banks, have also campaigned for another all-female event.

Results

See also 
 NWA EmPowerrr, the all women event produced by NWA.

References

External links 
 

2018 WWE Network events
2018 WWE pay-per-view events
October 2018 events in the United States
2018 on Long Island
Events on Long Island
Events in Uniondale, New York
Professional wrestling in Uniondale, New York
Women in WWE
Women's professional wrestling shows